Robert Vidal (born 7 July 1933) is a former French cyclist. He competed at the 1952 and 1956 Summer Olympics.

References

1933 births
Living people
French male cyclists
Olympic cyclists of France
Cyclists at the 1952 Summer Olympics
Cyclists at the 1956 Summer Olympics
Place of birth missing (living people)